Bucinozomus is a monotypic genus of hubbardiid short-tailed whipscorpions, first described by Armas & Rehfeldt in 2015. Its single species, Bucinozomus hortuspalmarum is distributed in Germany.

References 

Schizomida genera
Monotypic arachnid genera